The Two Girls (French: Les deux gamines) is a 1936 French drama film directed by Maurice Champreux and René Hervil and starring Abel Tarride, Jacqueline Daix and Alice Tissot. It was based on a novel which was also turned into a 1921 silent film and a 1951 sound film.

The film's sets were designed by the art director Claude Bouxin.

Main cast
 Abel Tarride as Monsieur Bertal  
 Jacqueline Daix as Ginette  
 Maurice Escande as Pierre Manin  
 Alice Tissot as Mademoiselle Bénazer  
 Claude Barghon as Gaby  
 Fanely Revoil as Lisette Fleury  
 Madeleine Guitty as La mère Michaut  
 Bernard Lancret as Bersange  
 Max Maxudian as Le père Bénazer  
 René Bergeron as La Tringle 
 Sinoël as Chambertin

References

Bibliography 
 James L. Limbacher. Haven't I seen you somewhere before?: Remakes, sequels, and series in motion pictures and television, 1896-1978. Pierian Press, 1979.

External links 
 

1936 films
1936 drama films
French drama films
1930s French-language films
Films directed by René Hervil
Films directed by Maurice Champreux
Remakes of French films
Sound film remakes of silent films
Films scored by Maurice Yvain
French black-and-white films
1930s French films